Patna Dental College is an institution for  Dental science and is a part of the Aryabhatt knowledge  University, Patna, Bihar, India.

History

Patna Dental College was established by the Government of Bihar by Dr R.P. Lall on 9 September 1960 in the premises of Patna Medical College and Hospital.

Location

Presently, the college is situated in the heart of  the city on the bank of the river Ganges adjacent to PMCH on main Ashok Rajpath.

Department
  Oral, Medicine & Dental Radiology
 Prosthodontics
 Conservative Dentistry & Endodontics
 Orthodontics
 Periodontics
 Pediatric Dentistry
 Oral Pathology
 Oral Surgery
  Community Dentistry

Courses
 Bachelor of Dental Surgery (BDS)
 Master of Dental Surgery (MDS)

Alumni 
 Mansur Ahmad. President of the American Board of Oral and Maxillofacial Radiology (2013). President of the American Academy of Oral and Maxillofacial Radiology (2020).  Faculty member at the University of Minnesota.

References 

Dental colleges in India
Universities and colleges in Patna
Educational institutions established in 1960
Patna University
1960 establishments in Bihar
Colleges affiliated to Aryabhatta Knowledge University